The Newport and Shermans Valley Railroad was a nineteenth-century,  narrow gauge railroad in Pennsylvania. It ran from Newport, Pennsylvania to New Germantown, Pennsylvania. The railroad's founder David Gring, who previously ran the Diamond Valley Railroad in Huntingdon County, relocated and reutilized his two locomotives from his previous venture, which were a Portable Saddle Tanker 0-6-0 steam locomotive and a 4-4-0 steam locomotive from the Kane and Elk Railroad. The rail line carried lumber, and transferred it to the  Pennsylvania Railroad at Newport. The right of way was extended to an uncompleted tunnel through Conococheague Mountain, started in an attempt to connect with the Path Valley Railroad. This right of way was later used by the Perry Lumber Company Railroad.

References

External links
 Photo of uncompleted tunnel

Transportation in Perry County, Pennsylvania
Defunct Pennsylvania railroads
3 ft gauge railways in the United States
Narrow gauge railroads in Pennsylvania